The flag of Paris is vertically divided between the traditional colours of Paris, blue and red, both of which also feature in the city's coat of arms. Red is identified with Saint Denis, blue with Saint Martin.

The colours of Paris are the origin of the blue and red stripes in the flag of France, while the white stripe originally symbolised the monarchy. The French flag's colours were adopted as a cockade during the early stages of the French Revolution, when the country was still in the process of becoming a constitutional monarchy.

Other flags

References

See also
Coat of arms of Paris

Paris
Paris
Culture of Paris